In Europa may refer to:

 In Europa, a 1998 album by Sol Invictus (band)
 In Europa (series), a Dutch television series first broadcast from 2007 to 2009, based on the book with the same name
 In Europa, a book by Dutch writer Geert Mak.